Federal elections were held in the West Indies Federation for the first and only time on 25 March 1958. The result was a victory for the West Indies Federal Labour Party, which won 25 of the 45 seats in the House of Representatives.

Electoral system
Candidates were nominated on 28 February in all unit territories except Trinidad and Tobago, where candidates were nominated on 3 March.

The elections were held in a mix of single- and multi-member constituencies. In all territories except Jamaica and Trinidad and Tobago, the constituency covered the entire territory; Antigua and Barbuda elected two, Barbados five, Dominica two, Grenada two, Montserrat one, St Kitts-Nevis-Anguilla two, St Lucia two and St Vincent and the Grenadines two.

Jamaica had 17 constituencies based on the 14 parishes and three counties (which overlapped the parishes), meaning voters elected representatives from two levels. In Trinidad and Tobago, the ten seats were based on the counties, some of which were single-member (Tobago and Caroni) and some of which were multi-member (Saint George). In some cases counties were merged to form a single-member constituency (such as the Eastern Counties).

Campaign
In preparation for the elections, two Federation-wide parties were organised as confederations of local political parties. Both were organised by Jamaican politicians: the West Indies Federal Labour Party by Norman Manley, and the Democratic Labour Party, by Alexander Bustamante. In broad terms, the WIFLP consisted of the urban-based parties throughout the Federation, while the DLP consisted of the rural-based parties. A small third party, the Federal Democratic Party, was founded in November 1957 by a group of Trinidadians.

The platforms for the two major parties were similar in many respects. Both advocated maintaining and strengthening ties with the United Kingdom, United States, and Canada (countries with which the islands had strong cultural and economic links); encouraging and expanding tourism; working to bring British Guiana and British Honduras into the Federation and to obtain loans, financial aid, and technical assistance. Despite these similarities, there were differences. The WIFLP had advocated the encouragement of agriculture while the DLP had promised a climate favourable to both private industry and labour, development of human and economic resources. The WIFLP promised to encourage the Bahamas (in addition to British Guiana and British Honduras) to join the Federation, whereas the DLP did not. The WIFLP also campaigned to establish a central bank for the extension of credit resources and advocated a democratic socialist society and full internal self-government for all the unit territories, whilst avoiding the issues of freedom of movement and a customs union. The DLP said nothing about full internal self-government, attacked socialism, wished to avoid high taxation (via loans and technical aid) and emphasized West Indian unity, freedom of worship and speech and encouragement of trade unions.

Results
The WIFLP won the election with 25 seats and was supported by the Barbados National Party, which won 1 seat; the DLP won 19 seats. The bulk of the WIFLP seats came from the smaller islands, and the DLP won in Jamaica and Trinidad and Tobago.

WIFLP leader Grantley Adams of Barbados became Prime Minister.

By province

By constituency

Aftermath

Government formation
Following the elections, Grantley Herbert Adams of the WIFLP became Prime Minister following a 23–21 vote in the House (the Grenada members, while allied with WIFLP, supported the DLP). However, his selection was indicative of the problems the Federation would face; The expected leader of the WIFLP was Norman Manley, Premier of Jamaica, and the next logical choice was Eric Williams, Premier of Trinidad and Tobago. However, neither had contested the federal elections, preferring to remain in control of their respective island power bases, and were not eligible. This suggested that the leaders of the two most important provinces did not see the federation as viable. Similarly, Alexander Bustamante, the Jamaican founder of the DLP, also declined to contest the federal election, leaving the party leadership to the Trinidadian Ashford Sinanan. The absence of the leading Jamaican politicians from any role at the federal level was to undermine the federation's unity.

The Council of State included:

Prime Minister: Grantly Adams (Barbados)
Deputy Prime Minister and Minister of Trade and Industry: Carl La Corbiniere (St. Lucia)
Minister of Labour and Social Affairs: Phyllis Shand Allfrey (Dominica)
Minister of Finance: Robert Llewellyn Bradshaw (St. Kitts)
Minister of Natural Resources and Agriculture: F.B. Ricketts (Jamaica)
Minister of Communications and Works: W. Andrew Rose, (Trinidad)
Minister without Portfolio: Novelle Richards Richards, (Antigua)
Minister without Portfolio: V. B. Vaughn (Barbados) 
Leader of the Opposition: Ashford Sinanan (Trinidad)
Marshall of the House: John R. Ashmeade

Senate selection

The Senate was appointed in April 1958, shortly before the opening of Parliament. In a controversial move, Governor-General Lord Hailes consulted the opposition DLP groups in Trinidad and Jamaica and appointed one DLP nominee senator from each of those territories, resulting in 15 WIFLP senators and 4 DLP senators overall. Lord Hailes did this having taken account of the fact that St. Vincent was the only unit territory with a DLP government and that as a result the federal senate was going to be overwhelmingly pro WIFLP.

From the Senate, the Council of State included:

Minister without Portfolio: A.G.R. Byfield (Jamaica)
Minister without Portfolio: J.W. Liburd (St. Kitts-Nevis-Anguilla)
Minister without Portfolio: J.L. Charles (St. Lucia)

References

The National Archives (United Kingdom): File CO 1031/2628: Elections in Federation of West Indies.
West Indies Federal Archives Centre: File FWI-PM-GA-115: Issue of Writs By Governor-General for First Federal Elections 1958.
The Growth of the Modern West Indies. Gordon K. Lewis, Ian Randle Publishers, 2004.
Caribbean Elections - West Indies Federation

West Indies
Elections in Anguilla
Elections in Antigua and Barbuda
Elections in Barbados
Elections in the Cayman Islands
Elections in Dominica
Elections in Grenada
Elections in Jamaica
Elections in Montserrat
Elections in Saint Kitts and Nevis
Elections in Saint Lucia
West Indies federal elections
Elections in Saint Vincent and the Grenadines
Elections in Trinidad and Tobago
Election and referendum articles with incomplete results
West Indies federal elections
West Indies federal elections